Sonnet 24 is one of 154 sonnets written by the English playwright and poet William Shakespeare, and is a part of the Fair Youth sequence.

In the sonnet, Shakespeare treats the commonplace Renaissance conceit connecting heart and eye. Although it relates to other sonnets that explore this theme, Sonnet 24 is considered largely imitative and conventional.

Structure
Sonnet 24 is an English or Shakespearean sonnet. English sonnets contain fourteen lines, including three quatrains and a final couplet. It follows the typical rhyme scheme of the form ABAB CDCD EFEF GG, and is written in iambic pentameter, a type of poetic metre based on five pairs of metrically weak/strong syllabic positions per line. Line ten exemplifies a regular iambic pentameter:

 ×   /     ×     /     ×   /    ×     /    ×   / 
Mine eyes have drawn thy shape, and thine for me (24.10)
/ = ictus, a metrically strong syllabic position. × = nonictus.

The fourth line is regularized by the Elizabethan pronunciation of "pérspective".

Source and analysis
Edward Capell amended quarto "steeld" to "stelled," a word more closely related to the metaphor of the first quatrain. Edward Dowden notes parallels for the opening conceit in Henry Constable's Diana and in Thomas Watson's Tears of Fancy.

The poem's central conceit, the dialogue between heart and eye, was a period cliché. Sidney Lee traces it to Petrarch and notes analogues in the work of Ronsard, Michael Drayton, and Barnabe Barnes.

The poem has not enjoyed a high reputation. Henry Charles Beeching speculates that it might be a half-serious spoof of a clichéd type of poem. George Wyndham is among the few to take it completely seriously, providing a neoplatonic reading.

"Perspective" is the key trope in the second half of the poem, as it introduces the idea of the connection between speaker and beloved. Some editors have assumed that "perspective" was used, as often in the Renaissance, to refer to a specific type of optical illusion sometimes called a perspective house; however, Thomas Tyler and others demonstrated that the word was also known in its modern sense during the time.

Sonnet 46 and Sonnet 47 also present the eyes of the speaker as a character in the poem. Note that in Sonnet 24 both the singular eye and the plural eyes are used for the eyes of the speaker, contrary to Sonnet 46 and Sonnet 47 where only the singular is used.

References

Further references
Baldwin, T. W. (1950). On the Literary Genetics of Shakspeare's Sonnets. University of Illinois Press, Urbana.
Hubler, Edwin (1952). The Sense of Shakespeare's Sonnets. Princeton University Press, Princeton.
Schoenfeldt, Michael (2007). The Sonnets: The Cambridge Companion to Shakespeare's Poetry. Patrick Cheney, Cambridge University Press, Cambridge.

External links
 
 Paraphrase and analysis (Shakespeare-online)
 Analysis

British poems
Sonnets by William Shakespeare